Mahmoud Sultanovich Sakalov is a Russian politician of Ingush ethnicity. He is serving as the Chairman of the People's Assembly of the Republic of Ingushetia. Sakalov has an educated background, and is a lawyer.

Biography 
Sakalov was born in Makinsk, Kazakhstan on January 1, 1950 to Ingush parents, who were deported out of the Soviet Union. The family eventually returned to Russia, where he graduated from the Odessa Technological Institute of Food industry in 1975. Since 1992, Sakalov started his political career, where he was Chairman of the Committee of the Food Processing Industry, and worked as Deputy Minister of Agriculture in Ingushetia. He did, at one point study law. Since 2003, Sakalov is chairman of the People's Assembly of the Republic of Ingushetia. Sakalov is a member of the United Russia party since 2002. He is married, and has six children.

References 
 Biography
 Махмуд Сакалов: «Власть должна диктовать условия»

1950 births
Living people
United Russia politicians
21st-century Russian politicians